Esko Juhani Ukkonen (b. 1950)
is a Finnish theoretical computer scientist
known for his contributions to string algorithms,
and particularly for Ukkonen's algorithm
for suffix tree construction.
He is a professor emeritus of the University of Helsinki.

Biography

Ukkonen earned his PhD from the University of Helsinki in 1978,
where he has been a full professor since 1985.
He was the head of the computer science department at the University of Helsinki
in 1998--1999 and in 2010--2013,
and an Academy professor of the Academy of Finland in 1999--2004.
He is the Editor-in-Chief of the Nordic Journal of Computing since 1993.

Ukkonen is a First Class Knight of the Order of the White Rose of Finland (2000).
He is a member of Finnish Academy of Science and Letters since 2000,
and a foreign member of Estonian Academy of Sciences. 
A festschrift in his honour was published by Springer
in the Lecture Notes in Computer Science book series.
He holds an honorary doctorate from Aalto University (2014).

References

External links
 
 
 

Finnish computer scientists
Academic staff of the University of Helsinki
University of Helsinki alumni
Members of the Finnish Academy of Science and Letters
People from Savonlinna
Living people
1950 births